Totens Sparebank is a Norwegian savings bank, headquartered in Lena, Norway. The banks main market is
Oppland. The bank was established in 1854.

Totens Sparebank is the largest owner of Eika Gruppen.

References

Banks of Norway
Companies based in Oppland
Østre Toten
Banks established in 1854
Companies listed on the Oslo Stock Exchange
Norwegian companies established in 1854